Demountable copy is a term describing the method of manufacture of some signs in the United States. Demountable copy signage is built by attaching mass-produced sheet-metal characters (and graphics, such as route shields and arrows) to the sign face, through means such as screws, rivets and adhesives. 

Because of the ability to remove the preformed metal characters from the sign, demountable-copy signs can be easily altered to change their message by removing unwanted sections of the legend and installing new elements. However, newly manufactured characters must be stored until their use, which could potentially take up much more space than the rolls of retroreflective sheeting required for direct-applied copy.

Some states formerly applied their demountable characters to non-retroreflective sheeting but phased out the process when the glue used began to leak and damage the signs.

References

See also 

Button copy, older style of sign manufacture no longer commonly used
Retroreflective sheeting, common material for direct-applied copy

Road signs in the United States